The K7-K12 gas fields are significant natural gas producing areas in the Netherlands sector of the North Sea, about 130 km west of Den Helder. These six contiguous fields started producing gas in 1978 and are mostly still operational in 2021.

The fields 
The K7-K12 gas fields are located in the Southern North Sea. They extend over the Netherlands Blocks K7, K8, K9, K10, K11 and K12. The gas reservoirs have the following properties:

Development 
The K7-K12 reservoirs were developed by a number of offshore installations across the Blocks.      

The principal pipelines in the fields are:

Production 
Peak production from the fields was as follows:

Decommissioning 
The K10 and K11 installations are now closed and have been decommissioned.

See also 

 Helder, Helm and Hoorn oil fields
 Kotter and Logger oil and gas fields
 L4-L7 gas fields
 L10 gas field
K12-B
 K13 gas fields
K14-K18 gas fields

References 
 
North Sea energy
North Sea
Natural gas fields in the Netherlands